Fraser MacKenzie is a journalist, teacher and ex-shinty player from Drumnadrochit, Scotland. He contributes shinty coverage to BBC Radio Scotland's Sports Report and to the Sunday Herald as well as commentating for Radio Scotland. He also writes the "Keeping out of the D" Blog. He played shinty for Glenurquhart Shinty Club.

He is a teacher at Inverness High School.

References

External links
Keeping Out The D

Living people
Shinty players
Scottish journalists
Scottish educators
Year of birth missing (living people)